Lo-debar was a town in the Old Testament in Gilead not far from Mahanaim, north of the Jabbok river in ancient Israel. It is mentioned in the Hebrew Bible as the home of Machir, a contemporary of David. (2 Samuel 9:4,5).

Lo-debar was also considered a ghetto town in biblical times. Mephibosheth, son of Jonathan was living in Lo-debar at the house of Machir, son of Ammiel, who was possibly a brother to David's wife Bathsheba (see 1 Chronicles 3 verse 5).  King David showed loving kindness to Jonathan's son Mephibosheth by bringing him from Lo-debar and having him eat at the King's table regularly. (2 Samuel 9:1-13).

It is usually believed to be the same as Debir in the Tribe of Gad.()  The word means "no pasture,"() "no word" or "no communication".

Possible locations are:
 Tel Dover (Khirbet ed-Duweir) in the mouth of Yarmouk River. Established as an Iron Age fortified settlement.
 Khirbet Umm ed-Dabar, Jordan Valley.

References

Hebrew Bible cities
Gilead

he:לדבר (עיר מקראית)